Luna is the eighth studio album by the German medieval folk band Faun. It was released on 5 September 2014 and has become Faun's most successful release.

Reception
The Sonic Seducer wrote that Faun appeared to be unsure of their direction on this album. The reviewer remarked an original songwriting and the reduction of singer Katja Moslehner's "all too changeable voice", but also criticized influences of mainstream pop music.

Track listing
Luna includes the following tracks.

Charts
Luna peaked at position 4 in the German album charts making it Faun's most successful album in Germany so far. It was also Faun's first album to enter the Dutch album charts.

References

2014 albums
Faun (band) albums